The National Restoration Party (NAREP) is a  political party in Zambia.

History
NAREP was established in March 2010 by Elias Chipimo Jr. Chipimo was the party's presidential candidate in the 2011 general elections, finishing fifth in a field of ten candidates with 0.4% of the vote. In the National Assembly elections the party received 0.2% of the vote and failed to win a seat.

Chipimo ran again in the 2015 presidential by-election, finishing seventh out of the eleven candidates with 0.4% of the vote.

In 2019, Chipimo retired from his position as leader of NAREP, and was replaced by Muvi TV owner Steven Nyirenda.

References

External links
Official website

Political parties in Zambia
Political parties established in 2010
2010 establishments in Zambia